The Peoria Rivermen were a professional ice hockey team in the American Hockey League. They played in Peoria, Illinois, at the Carver Arena. After the 2012–13 AHL season, the team relocated to Utica, New York, and became the Utica Comets.

History
In 2011, Dave Checketts announced that the St. Louis Blues, Scottrade Center, and the Peoria Rivermen were all for sale. On May 10, 2012, Tom Stillman purchased the Peoria Rivermen franchise. On August 30, the Rivermen signed a one-year affiliation agreement with the Evansville IceMen, an expansion team in the ECHL, cutting ties with the Alaska Aces, who they were affiliated with since the Rivermen joined the AHL.

On March 29, 2013, the Rivermen were purchased by the Vancouver Canucks. On April 18, 2013, the AHL approved the sale of the Peoria Rivermen to the Vancouver Canucks.

On May 13, 2013, the Vancouver Canucks confirmed with Peoria Civic Center officials that they would not bring back the Rivermen franchise and the AHL's Peoria Rivermen would no longer play in Peoria. The AHL announced on June 14, 2013, that the franchise was being relocated to Utica, New York, as the Utica Comets for the 2013–14 AHL season.

A Southern Professional Hockey League franchise replaced the AHL incarnation of the Rivermen in 2013 and took the team's name.

Season-by-season results

Players

Team captains
Brendan Buckley, 2005–2006
Aaron MacKenzie, 2006–2008
Trent Whitfield, 2008–2009
Yan Stastny, 2009–2010
Dean Arsene, 2010–2011
Adam Cracknell, 2011–2012
Scott Ford, 2012–2013

Coaches
2005–2006: Steve Pleau
2006–2008: Dave Baseggio
2008 – Jan 2, 2010: Davis Payne
January 2, 2010 – April 2010: Rick Wamsley
2010–2012: Jared Bednar
2012–2013: Dave Allison

References

 
St. Louis Blues
Ice hockey teams in Illinois
Defunct ice hockey teams in Illinois
St. Louis Blues minor league affiliates
Ice hockey clubs established in 2005
Ice hockey clubs disestablished in 2013